Jackson Township is one of the fifteen townships of Seneca County, Ohio, United States.  The 2010 census found 1,512 people in the township.

Geography
Located in the northwestern corner of the county, it borders the following townships:
Scott Township, Sandusky County - north
Jackson Township, Sandusky County - northeast corner
Liberty Township - east
Hopewell Township -southeast corner 
Loudon Township - south
Washington Township, Hancock County - southwest corner
Perry Township, Wood County - west
Montgomery Township, Wood County - northwest corner

Part of the city of Fostoria is located in southwestern Jackson Township.

Name and history
Jackson Township was organized in 1832.

It is one of thirty-seven Jackson Townships statewide.

Government
The township is governed by a three-member board of trustees, who are elected in November of odd-numbered years to a four-year term beginning on the following January 1. Two are elected in the year after the presidential election and one is elected in the year before it. There is also an elected township fiscal officer, who serves a four-year term beginning on April 1 of the year after the election, which is held in November of the year before the presidential election. Vacancies in the fiscal officership or on the board of trustees are filled by the remaining trustees.

References

External links
County website

Townships in Seneca County, Ohio
Townships in Ohio